Ruthenium tetroxide is the inorganic compound with the formula RuO4. It is a yellow volatile solid that melts near room temperature. It has the odor of ozone. Samples are typically black due to impurities. The analogous OsO4 is more widely used and better known. It is also the anhydride of hyperruthenic acid (H2RuO5). One of the few solvents in which RuO4 forms stable solutions is CCl4.

Preparation 
RuO4 is prepared by oxidation of ruthenium(III) chloride with NaIO4.

8 Ru3+(aq) + 5 IO4−(aq) + 12 H2O(l) → 8 RuO4(s) + 5 I−(aq) + 24 H+(aq)

Due to its challenging reactivity, RuO4 it is always generated in situ and used in catalytic quantities, at least in organic reactions.   Typically a solution of ruthenium trichloride is oxidized by sodium metaperiodate.

Structure 
RuO4 forms two crystal structures, one with cubic symmetry and another with monoclinic symmetry, isotypic to OsO4. The molecule adopts a tetrahedral geometry, with the Ru–O distances ranging from 169 to 170 pm.

Uses

Isolation of ruthenium from ores
The main commercial value of RuO4 is as an intermediate in the production of ruthenium compounds and metal from ores.  Like other platinum group metals (PGMs), ruthenium occurs at low concentrations and often mixed with other PGMs.  Together with OsO4, it is separated from other PGMs by distillation of a chlorine-oxidized extract.  Ruthenium is separated from OsO4 by reducing RuO4 with hydrochloric acid, a process that exploits the highly positive reduction potential for the [RuO4]0/- couple.

Organic chemistry

RuO4 is of specialized value in organic chemistry because it oxidizes virtually any hydrocarbon. For example, it will oxidize adamantane to 1-adamantanol. Because it is such an aggressive oxidant, reaction conditions must be mild, generally room temperature. Although a strong oxidant, RuO4 oxidations do not perturb stereocenters that are not oxidized. Illustrative is the oxidation of the following diol to a carboxylic acid:

Oxidation of epoxy alcohols also occurs without degradation of the epoxide ring:

Under milder conditions, oxidative reaction yields aldehydes instead. RuO4 readily converts secondary alcohols into ketones. Although similar results can be achieved with other cheaper oxidants such as PCC- or DMSO-based oxidants, RuO4 is ideal when a very vigorous oxidant is needed, but mild conditions must be maintained. It is used in organic synthesis to oxidize internal alkynes to 1,2-diketones, and terminal alkynes along with primary alcohols to carboxylic acids. When used in this fashion, the ruthenium(VIII) oxide is used in catalytic amounts and regenerated by the addition of sodium periodate to ruthenium(III) chloride and a solvent mixture of acetonitrile, water and carbon tetrachloride. RuO4 readily cleaves double bonds to yield carbonyl products, in a manner similar to ozonolysis. OsO4, a more familiar oxidant that is structurally similar to RuO4, does not cleave double bonds, instead producing vicinal diol products.  However, with short reaction times and carefully controlled conditions, RuO4 can also be used for dihydroxylation.

Because RuO4 degrades the "double bonds" of arenes (especially electron-rich ones) by dihydroxylation and cleavage of the C-C bond in a way few other reagents can, it is useful as a "deprotection" reagent for carboxylic acids that are masked as aryl groups (typically phenyl or p-methoxyphenyl).  Because the fragments formed are themselves readily oxidizable by RuO4, a substantial fraction of the arene carbon atoms undergo exhaustive oxidation to form carbon dioxide.  Consequently, multiple equivalents of the terminal oxidant (often in excess of 10 equivalents per aryl ring) are required to achieve complete conversion to the carboxylic acid, limiting the practicality of the transformation.

Although used as a direct oxidant, due to the relatively high cost of RuO4 it is also used catalytically with a cooxidant. For an oxidation of cyclic alcohols with RuO4 as a catalyst and bromate as oxidant under basic conditions, RuO4 is first activated by hydroxide, turning into the hyperruthenate anion:

RuO4 + OH− → HRuO5−
The reaction proceeds via a glycolate complex.

Other uses
Ruthenium tetroxide is a potential staining agent.  It is used to expose latent fingerprints by turning to the brown/black ruthenium dioxide when in contact with fatty oils or fats contained in sebaceous contaminants of the print.

Gaseous release by nuclear accidents 

Because of the very high volatility of ruthenium tetroxide ruthenium radioactive isotopes with their relative short half-life are considered as the second most hazardous gaseous isotopes after iodine-131 in case of release by a nuclear accident. The two most important radioactive isotopes of ruthenium are 103Ru and 106Ru. They have half-lives of 39.6 days and 373.6 days, respectively.

References

Further reading 
 
 
 
 

Ruthenium compounds
Electron microscopy stains
Transition metal oxides